Shut Up and Listen to Majosha is Majosha's first and only full-length album, released in 1989. This album never made it to CD, and was only ever available on vinyl and cassette. All songs were written by Ben Folds and Millard Powers except "Emaline", written by both Ben Folds and Evan Olson. Songs "Emaline" and "Video" later appeared on Ben Folds Five albums, and "Kalamazoo" was released on the Folds solo EP Super D.

Track listing
All songs written by Ben Folds, except where noted.

Vinyl version

Cassette version 

 Track A1 is listed as "We Know What's Right For You" on the spine of the cover, as well as the label of the cassette itself.

Personnel

The band
Millard Powers – guitar, vocals, producer
Ben Folds – bass guitar, piano, vocals, drums (various tracks), producer
Evan Olson – vocals
Chris Brown – drums (various tracks)
Dave Rich – drums (various tracks)

External links
Joey's Shut Up and Listen to Majosha page

Ben Folds albums
1989 debut albums
Albums produced by Ben Folds